The 1985 Toronto Blue Jays season was the franchise's ninth season of Major League Baseball. It resulted in the Blue Jays finishing first in the American League East with a record of 99 wins and 62 losses. The win total of 99 is a franchise record, and the division title was the franchise's first.

Despite having the second-best record in Major League Baseball, the Blue Jays collapsed in the American League Championship Series against the Kansas City Royals, blowing a 3–1 series lead and losing in seven games.

Offseason
 December 3, 1984: Rule 5 draft
Manuel Lee was drafted by the Blue Jays from the Houston Astros.
Lou Thornton was drafted by the Blue Jays from the New York Mets.
 December 8, 1984: Alfredo Griffin, Dave Collins, and cash were traded by the Blue Jays to the Oakland Athletics for Bill Caudill.
 January 24, 1985: Tom Henke was chosen by the Blue Jays from the Texas Rangers as a free agent compensation pick.
 January 26, 1985: Jim Gott, Augie Schmidt (minors), and Jack McKnight (minors) were traded by the Blue Jays to the San Francisco Giants for Gary Lavelle.

Regular season
 April 27, 1985: Willie Aikens hit a home run in the last at-bat of his career.
 July 9, 1985: In a game between the Blue Jays and the Mariners at Seattle, Buck Martinez executed a double play by tagging out two runners at home plate. In the third inning, Phil Bradley was on second when Gorman Thomas singled. Bradley was tagged out at home, on a throw from Jesse Barfield to Martinez. There was a collision between Bradley and Martinez – Martinez broke his ankle. Martinez was sitting on the ground in agony and threw the ball to third base in an attempt to tag out Gorman Thomas. The throw went into left field and Thomas ran towards home plate. Toronto left fielder George Bell threw the ball back to Martinez. He was still seated on the ground in pain but was able to tag Gorman Thomas for the out. Martinez tagged out both runners at home plate.
 Dave Stieb led the American League with a 2.48 ERA and pitched 26 consecutive scoreless innings.

Season standings

Record vs. opponents

Notable transactions
 May 31, 1985: Pedro Muñoz was signed by the Blue Jays as an amateur free agent.
 June 3, 1985: 1985 Major League Baseball draft
The Blue Jays drafted outfielder Greg David with the twenty-fifth overall pick in the 1985 Draft.
Jim Abbott was drafted by the Blue Jays in the 36th round, but did not sign.
Todd Stottlemyre was drafted by the Blue Jays in the 1st round (3rd pick) of the (Secondary Phase). Player signed August 12, 1985.
 June 22, 1985: Mitch Webster was traded by the Blue Jays to the Montreal Expos for a player to be named later. The Expos completed the deal by sending Cliff Young to the Blue Jays on September 10.
 July 9, 1985: Len Matuszek was traded by the Blue Jays to the Los Angeles Dodgers for Al Oliver.
 August 28, 1985: The Blue Jays traded players to be named later to the Texas Rangers for Cliff Johnson. The Blue Jays completed the deal by sending Matt Williams and Jeff Mays (minors) to the Rangers on August 29, and Greg Ferlenda (minors) to the Rangers on November 14.
 September 15, 1985: Junior Félix was signed by the Blue Jays as a free agent.
 September 17, 1985: Francisco Cabrera was signed by the Blue Jays as an amateur free agent.

Roster

Game log

|- align="center" bgcolor="ffbbbb"
| 1 || April 8 || @ Royals || 1–2 || Black (1–0) || Stieb (0–1) || Quisenberry (1) || 41,086 || 0–1 || Boxscore
|- align="center" bgcolor="bbffbb"
| 2 || April 10 || @ Royals || 1–0 (10) || Caudill (1–0) || Beckwith (0–1) || Lavelle (1) || 14,740 || 1–1 || Boxscore
|- align="center" bgcolor="bbffbb"
| 3 || April 11 || @ Royals || 4–3 (10) || Caudill (2–0) || Quisenberry (0–1) || Acker (1) || 17,798 || 2–1 || Boxscore
|- align="center" bgcolor="ffbbbb"
| 4 || April 12 || @ Orioles || 7 – 2 || McGregor (1-0) || Key (0-1) || Stewart (2) || 26,585 || 2-2
|- align="center" bgcolor="ffbbbb"
| 5 || April 13 || @ Orioles || 8 – 7 || Martinez (1-0) || Caudill (2-1) || || 28,529 || 2-3
|- align="center" bgcolor="bbffbb"
| 6 || April 14 || @ Orioles || 5 – 3 || Alexander (1-0) || Boddicker (1-1) || Acker (2) || 25,111 || 3-3
|- align="center" bgcolor="ffbbbb"
| 7 || April 16 || Rangers || 9 – 4 || Mason (1-1) || Leal (0-1) || Noles (1) || 41,284 || 3-4
|- align="center" bgcolor="bbffbb"
| 8 || April 17 || Rangers || 3 – 1 (10) || Caudill (3-1) || Stewart (0-1) || || 15,472 || 4-4
|- align="center" bgcolor="bbffbb"
| 9 || April 18 || Rangers || 4 – 2 || Stieb (1-1) || Tanana (0-2) || Caudill (1) || 15,380 || 5-4
|- align="center" bgcolor="bbffbb"
| 10 || April 19 || Orioles || 6 – 5 || Alexander (2-0) || Stewart (1-1) || Caudill (2) || 20,213 || 6-4
|- align="center" bgcolor="bbffbb"
| 11 || April 20 || Orioles || 3 – 2 || Musselman (1-0) || Martinez (1-1) || Lavelle (2) || 40,451 || 7-4
|- align="center" bgcolor="ffbbbb"
| 12 || April 21 || Orioles || 3 – 2 || Martínez (1-1) || Key (0-2) || Martínez (1) || 29,082 || 7-5
|- align="center" bgcolor="ffbbbb"
| 13 || April 22 || Royals || 0–2 || Leibrandt (2–0) || Stieb (1–2) || || 20,281 || 7–6 || Boxscore
|- align="center" bgcolor="ffbbbb"
| 14 || April 23 || Royals || 6–7 || Beckwith (1–1) || Caudill (3–2) || Quisenberry (2) || 18,491 || 7–7 || Boxscore
|- align="center" bgcolor="bbffbb"
| 15 || April 24 || Royals || 10–2 || Leal (1–1) || Saberhagen (1–2) || || 18,006 || 8–7 || Boxscore
|- align="center" bgcolor="bbffbb"
| 16 || April 26 || @ Rangers || 6 – 5 || Lamp (1-0) || Schmidt (0-1) || Caudill (3) || 10,725 || 9-7
|- align="center" bgcolor="bbffbb"
| 17 || April 27 || @ Rangers || 9 – 8 (10) || Acker (1-0) || Stewart (0-2) || Caudill (4) || 13,769 || 10-7
|- align="center" bgcolor="bbffbb"
| 18 || April 28 || @ Rangers || 6 – 3 || Alexander (3-0) || Mason (2-2) || || 11,324 || 11-7
|- align="center" bgcolor="bbffbb"
| 19 || April 29 || @ Athletics || 2 – 1 || Leal (2-1) || Krueger (2-2) || Caudill (5) || 13,852 || 12-7
|- align="center" bgcolor="bbffbb"
| 20 || April 30 || @ Athletics || 4 – 3 || Lamp (2-0) || Howell (0-1) || Acker (3) || 6,439 || 13-7
|-

|- align="center" bgcolor="bbffbb"
| 21 || May 1 || @ Angels || 6 – 3 || Key (1-2) || McCaskill (0-1) || || 24,112 || 14-7
|- align="center" bgcolor="ffbbbb"
| 22 || May 2 || @ Angels || 3 – 2 || Clements (2-0) || Stieb (1-3) || || 23,824 || 14-8
|- align="center" bgcolor="bbffbb"
| 23 || May 3 || @ Mariners || 5 – 4 || Alexander (4-0) || Barojas (0-3) || Caudill (6) || 12,370 || 15-8
|- align="center" bgcolor="ffbbbb"
| 24 || May 4 || @ Mariners || 8 – 1 || Young (2-3) || Leal (2-2) || || 14,952 || 15-9
|- align="center" bgcolor="ffbbbb"
| 25 || May 5 || @ Mariners || 4 – 1 || Langston (4-2) || Clancy (0-1) || || 11,500 || 15-10
|- align="center" bgcolor="bbffbb"
| 26 || May 7 || Athletics || 10 – 1 || Stieb (2-3) || Sutton (2-3) || || 21,292 || 16-10
|- align="center" bgcolor="ffbbbb"
| 27 || May 8 || Athletics || 6 – 4 || McCatty (2-1) || Alexander (4-1) || Howell (8) || 18,102 || 16-11
|- align="center" bgcolor="bbffbb"
| 28 || May 10 || Mariners || 8 – 3 || Key (2-2) || Langston (4-3) || Acker (4) || 20,116 || 17-11
|- align="center" bgcolor="bbffbb"
| 29 || May 11 || Mariners || 4 – 2 || Caudill (4-2) || Young (2-4) || || 32,398 || 18-11
|- align="center" bgcolor="bbffbb"
| 30 || May 12 || Mariners || 9 – 5 || Stieb (3-3) || Beattie (1-4) || || 25,181 || 19-11
|- align="center" bgcolor="bbffbb"
| 31 || May 14 || Angels || 6 – 3 || Alexander (5-1) || Slaton (3-2) || Caudill (7) || 22,445 || 20-11
|- align="center" bgcolor="ffbbbb"
| 32 || May 15 || Angels || 9 – 6 || Moore (2-1) || Caudill (4-3) || || 18,119 || 20-12
|- align="center" bgcolor="ffbbbb"
| 33 || May 17 || @ Twins || 7 – 6 (11) || Filson (1-0) || Leal (2-3) || || 19,253 || 20-13
|- align="center" bgcolor="bbffbb"
| 34 || May 18 || @ Twins || 3 – 1 || Clancy (1-1) || Smithson (4-3) || Acker (5) || 16,824 || 21-13
|- align="center" bgcolor="ffbbbb"
| 35 || May 19 || @ Twins || 8 – 2 || Filson (2-0) || Alexander (5-2) || || 25,151 || 21-14
|- align="center" bgcolor="bbffbb"
| 36 || May 20 || White Sox || 6 – 1 || Key (3-2) || Seaver (4-2) || || 44,715 || 22-14
|- align="center" bgcolor="bbffbb"
| 37 || May 21 || White Sox || 4 – 3 || Lavelle (1-0) || James (1-1) || || 20,159 || 23-14
|- align="center" bgcolor="bbffbb"
| 38 || May 22 || White Sox || 10 – 0 || Stieb (4-3) || Dotson (2-2) || || 22,447 || 24-14
|- align="center" bgcolor="bbffbb"
| 39 || May 23 || @ Indians || 6 – 5 || Lamp (3-0) || Waddell (1-3) || Caudill (8) || 4,333 || 25-14
|- align="center" bgcolor="bbffbb"
| 40 || May 24 || @ Indians || 7 – 6 || Lamp (4-0) || Creel (0-2) || Lavelle (3) || 8,502 || 26-14
|- align="center" bgcolor="bbffbb"
| 41 || May 25 || @ Indians || 10 – 7 || Musselman (2-0) || Thompson (1-2) || Acker (6) || 7,345 || 27-14
|- align="center" bgcolor="bbffbb"
| 42 || May 26 || @ Indians || 6 – 5 || Lavelle (2-0) || Creel (0-3) || Caudill (9) || 13,255 || 28-14
|- align="center" bgcolor="bbbbbb"
| -- || May 27 || @ White Sox || colspan=6|Postponed (rain) Rescheduled for August 23
|- align="center" bgcolor="bbffbb"
| 43 || May 28 || @ White Sox || 6 – 1 || Stieb (5-3) || Dotson (2-3) || || 14,598 || 29-14
|- align="center" bgcolor="ffbbbb"
| 44 || May 29 || @ White Sox || 8 – 5 || Burns (6-4) || Clancy (1-2) || James (8) || 18,953 || 29-15
|- align="center" bgcolor="bbffbb"
| 45 || May 31 || Indians || 7 – 2 || Alexander (6-2) || Clark (1-1) || Acker (7) || 24,166 || 30-15
|-

|- align="center" bgcolor="bbffbb"
| 46 || June 1 || Indians || 8 – 3 || Key (4-2) || Blyleven (3-6) || || 33,296 || 31-15
|- align="center" bgcolor="ffbbbb"
| 47 || June 2 || Indians || 5 – 4 || Heaton (4-4) || Stieb (5-4) || Waddell (8) || || 31-16
|- align="center" bgcolor="bbffbb"
| 48 || June 2 || Indians || 5 – 2 || Leal (3-3) || Behenna (0-1) || Acker (8) || 35,315 || 32-16
|- align="center" bgcolor="bbffbb"
| 49 || June 4 || Twins || 9 – 2 || Clancy (2-2) || Viola (6-5) || || 27,163 || 33-16
|- align="center" bgcolor="bbffbb"
| 50 || June 5 || Twins || 5 – 0 || Alexander (7-2) || Smithson (4-5) || || 26,087 || 34-16
|- align="center" bgcolor="bbffbb"
| 51 || June 6 || Tigers || 2 – 0 (12) || Acker (2-0) || López (0-4) || || 36,384 || 35-16
|- align="center" bgcolor="bbffbb"
| 52 || June 7 || Tigers || 9 – 2 || Stieb (6-4) || Terrell (6-2) || || 42,455 || 36-16
|- align="center" bgcolor="ffbbbb"
| 53 || June 8 || Tigers || 10 – 1 || O'Neal (1-0) || Leal (3-4) || || 44,484 || 36-17
|- align="center" bgcolor="ffbbbb"
| 54 || June 9 || Tigers || 8 – 3 || Bair (1-0) || Clancy (2-3) || || 40,273 || 36-18
|- align="center" bgcolor="ffbbbb"
| 55 || June 10 || @ Yankees || 4 – 2 || Shirley (1-1) || Alexander (7-3) || Righetti (11) || 20,329 || 36-19
|- align="center" bgcolor="bbffbb"
| 56 || June 11 || @ Yankees || 4 – 1 (11) || Lamp (5-0) || Fisher (2-1) || || 22,620 || 37-19
|- align="center" bgcolor="bbffbb"
| 57 || June 12 || @ Yankees || 3 – 2 (10) || Acker (3-0) || Bordi (1-1) || || 25,129 || 38-19
|- align="center" bgcolor="ffbbbb"
| 58 || June 13 || @ Red Sox || 8 – 7 || Trujillo (1-1) || Lavelle (2-1) || Stanley (8) || 22,459 || 38-20
|- align="center" bgcolor="ffbbbb"
| 59 || June 14 || @ Red Sox || 4 – 1 || Boyd (8-4) || Clancy (2-4) || || 33,809 || 38-21
|- align="center" bgcolor="ffbbbb"
| 60 || June 15 || @ Red Sox || 7 – 5 || Stanley (2-2) || Acker (3-1) || || 35,664 || 38-22
|- align="center" bgcolor="ffbbbb"
| 61 || June 16 || @ Red Sox || 7 – 6 || Crawford (4-2) || Lavelle (2-2) || || 27,700 || 38-23
|- align="center" bgcolor="ffbbbb"
| 62 || June 17 || @ Brewers || 2 – 1 || Haas (6-3) || Stieb (6-5) || || 16,889 || 38-24
|- align="center" bgcolor="ffbbbb"
| 63 || June 18 || @ Brewers || 4 – 1 || Burris (4-5) || Leal (3-5) || || 18,568 || 38-25
|- align="center" bgcolor="bbffbb"
| 64 || June 19 || @ Brewers || 5 – 1 || Clancy (3-4) || Vuckovich (2-5) || Caudill (10) || 25,607 || 39-25
|- align="center" bgcolor="bbffbb"
| 65 || June 20 || Red Sox || 6 – 5 || Acker (4-1) || Stanley (2-3) || Caudill (11) || 35,050 || 40-25
|- align="center" bgcolor="bbffbb"
| 66 || June 21 || Red Sox || 7 – 2 || Key (5-2) || Hurst (2-7) || || 36,252 || 41-25
|- align="center" bgcolor="ffbbbb"
| 67 || June 22 || Red Sox || 5 – 3 || Stanley (3-3) || Acker (4-2) || || 42,117 || 41-26
|- align="center" bgcolor="bbffbb"
| 68 || June 23 || Red Sox || 8 – 1 || Stieb (7-5) || Kison (3-2) || || 34,128 || 42-26
|- align="center" bgcolor="bbffbb"
| 69 || June 25 || Brewers || 7 – 1 || Clancy (4-4) || Burris (4-6) || || 30,019 || 43-26
|- align="center" bgcolor="ffbbbb"
| 70 || June 26 || Brewers || 5 – 4 || Gibson (6-4) || Alexander (7-4) || || 27,397 || 43-27
|- align="center" bgcolor="bbffbb"
| 71 || June 27 || Brewers || 7 – 3 || Key (6-2) || Higuera (4-5) || Acker (9) || 28,228 || 44-27
|- align="center" bgcolor="bbffbb"
| 72 || June 28 || @ Tigers || 2 – 0 || Stieb (8-5) || Petry (9-6) || || 48,002 || 45-27
|- align="center" bgcolor="ffbbbb"
| 73 || June 29 || @ Tigers || 8 – 0 || Terrell (9-3) || Leal (3-6) || || 47,965 || 45-28
|- align="center" bgcolor="bbffbb"
| 74 || June 30 || @ Tigers || 6 – 5 || Lavelle (3-2) || López (1-5) || Lamp (1) || 44,377 || 46-28
|-

|- align="center" bgcolor="ffbbbb"
| 75 || July 1 || Yankees || 4 – 1 || Cowley (7-3) || Alexander (7-5) || Righetti (14) || 41,476 || 46-29
|- align="center" bgcolor="ffbbbb"
| 76 || July 2 || Yankees || 5 – 3 || Whitson (4-6) || Key (6-3) || || 35,202 || 46-30
|- align="center" bgcolor="bbffbb"
| 77 || July 3 || Yankees || 3 – 2 (10) || Acker (5-2) || Bordi (1-2) || || 40,376 || 47-30
|- align="center" bgcolor="ffbbbb"
| 78 || July 4 || @ Athletics || 3 – 2 || Howell (8-3) || Caudill (4-4) || || 46,770 || 47-31
|- align="center" bgcolor="bbffbb"
| 79 || July 5 || @ Athletics || 8 – 2 || Clancy (5-4) || Krueger (5-8) || || 17,937 || 48-31
|- align="center" bgcolor="ffbbbb"
| 80 || July 6 || @ Athletics || 5 – 1 || Sutton (8-5) || Alexander (7-6) || || 23,230 || 48-32
|- align="center" bgcolor="bbffbb"
| 81 || July 7 || @ Athletics || 8 – 2 || Key (7-3) || McCatty (4-4) || || 28,631 || 49-32
|- align="center" bgcolor="bbffbb"
| 82 || July 8 || @ Mariners || 4 – 0 || Stieb (9-5) || Moore (7-5) || || 20,817 || 50-32
|- align="center" bgcolor="bbffbb"
| 83 || July 9 || @ Mariners || 9 – 4 (13) || Musselman (3-0) || Vande Berg (0-1) || || 10,393 || 51-32
|- align="center" bgcolor="bbffbb"
| 84 || July 10 || @ Mariners || 11 – 1 || Clancy (6-4) || Wills (4-2) || || 12,815 || 52-32
|- align="center" bgcolor="bbffbb"
| 85 || July 11 || @ Angels || 5 – 3 || Alexander (8-6) || Slaton (4-8) || Lavelle (4) || 31,672 || 53-32
|- align="center" bgcolor="ffbbbb"
| 86 || July 12 || @ Angels || 5 – 3 || McCaskill (5-5) || Key (7-4) || Moore (17) || 35,870 || 53-33
|- align="center" bgcolor="ffbbbb"
| 87 || July 13 || @ Angels || 4 – 3 || Witt (7-6) || Lavelle (3-3) || || 42,054 || 53-34
|- align="center" bgcolor="ffbbbb"
| 88 || July 14 || @ Angels || 5 – 3 || Cliburn (4-2) || Lavelle (3-4) || || 35,306 || 53-35
|- align="center" bgcolor="ffbbbb"
| 89 || July 18 || Athletics || 6 – 4 || Ontiveros (1-1) || Lavelle (3-5) || Howell (19) || 32,231 || 53-36
|- align="center" bgcolor="bbffbb"
| 90 || July 19 || Athletics || 5 – 1 || Key (8-4) || Sutton (9-6) || || 28,218 || 54-36
|- align="center" bgcolor="ffbbbb"
| 91 || July 20 || Athletics || 5 – 1 || Birtsas (6-2) || Stieb (9-6) || Ontiveros (2) || 35,187 || 54-37
|- align="center" bgcolor="bbffbb"
| 92 || July 21 || Athletics || 11 – 4 || Lamp (6-0) || Krueger (7-9) || || 36,109 || 55-37
|- align="center" bgcolor="bbffbb"
| 93 || July 22 || Mariners || 3 – 1 || Filer (1-0) || Langston (5-7) || Caudill (12) || 25,110 || 56-37
|- align="center" bgcolor="bbffbb"
| 94 || July 23 || Mariners || 4 – 2 || Alexander (9-6) || Moore (8-6) || Caudill (13) || 28,419 || 57-37
|- align="center" bgcolor="bbffbb"
| 95 || July 24 || Mariners || 3 – 1 || Key (9-4) || Young (7-11) || Lavelle (5) || 26,163 || 58-37
|- align="center" bgcolor="bbffbb"
| 96 || July 25 || Angels || 7 – 0 || Stieb (10-6) || Witt (8-7) || || 32,083 || 59-37
|- align="center" bgcolor="bbffbb"
| 97 || July 26 || Angels || 8 – 3 || Clancy (7-4) || Lugo (3-3) || || 31,294 || 60-37
|- align="center" bgcolor="bbffbb"
| 98 || July 27 || Angels || 8 – 3 || Filer (2-0) || Mack (0-1) || Acker (10) || 44,116 || 61-37
|- align="center" bgcolor="bbffbb"
| 99 || July 28 || Angels || 5 – 1 || Alexander (10-6) || McCaskill (6-7) || || 36,190 || 62-37
|- align="center" bgcolor="bbffbb"
| 100 || July 29 || @ Orioles || 4 – 3 (10) || Henke (1-0) || Boddicker (10-11) || || 41,599 || 63-37
|- align="center" bgcolor="ffbbbb"
| 101 || July 30 || @ Orioles || 4 – 3 (10) || Aase (6-5) || Lavelle (3-6) || || 26,561 || 63-38
|- align="center" bgcolor="bbffbb"
| 102 || July 31 || @ Orioles || 5 – 3 || Henke (2-0) || Martínez (7-7) || || 32,044 || 64-38
|-

|- align="center" bgcolor="bbffbb"
| 103 || August 1 || @ Orioles || 9 – 3 || Filer (3-0) || Davis (5-7) || || 27,745 || 65-38
|- align="center" bgcolor="bbffbb"
| 104 || August 2 || Rangers || 5 – 3 || Alexander (11-6) || Cook (2-3) || Henke (1) || 28,429 || 66-38
|- align="center" bgcolor="bbffbb"
| 105 || August 3 || Rangers || 4 – 1 || Lamp (7-0) || Welsh (2-3) || Caudill (14) || 35,109 || 67-38
|- align="center" bgcolor="ffbbbb"
| 106 || August 4 || Rangers || 8 – 4 || Hough (10-11) || Stieb (10-7) || Schmidt (4) || 36,272 || 67-39
|- align="center" bgcolor="bbffbb"
| 107 || August 8 || Orioles || 7 – 2 || Alexander (12-6) || McGregor (9-9) || || || 68-39
|- align="center" bgcolor="bbffbb"
| 108 || August 8 || Orioles || 7 – 4 || Filer (4-0) || Boddicker (10-13) || Henke (2) || 40,104 || 69-39
|- align="center" bgcolor="ffbbbb"
| 109 || August 9 || @ Royals || 2–4 || Black (8–11) || Stieb (10–8) || || 25,868 || 69–40 || Boxscore
|- align="center" bgcolor="ffbbbb"
| 110 || August 10 || @ Royals || 3–4 (10) || Quisenberry (6–6) || Caudill (4–5) || || 34,448 || 69–41 || Boxscore
|- align="center" bgcolor="bbffbb"
| 111 || August 11 || @ Royals || 5–3 (10) || Henke (3–0) || Beckwith (1–5) || || 27,457 || 70–41 || Boxscore
|- align="center" bgcolor="ffbbbb"
| 112 || August 12 || @ Rangers || 5 – 4 || Henry (1-0) || Caudill (4-6) || || 10,829 || 70-42
|- align="center" bgcolor="bbffbb"
| 113 || August 13 || @ Rangers || 5 – 3 || Filer (5-0) || Russell (0-2) || Henke (3) || 9,790 || 71-42
|- align="center" bgcolor="bbffbb"
| 114 || August 14 || @ Rangers || 4 – 1 || Stieb (11-8) || Hough (11-12) || || 10,494 || 72-42
|- align="center" bgcolor="ffbbbb"
| 115 || August 16 || Royals || 2–4 || Leibrandt (11–6) || Key (9–5) || || 38,269 || 72–43 || Boxscore
|- align="center" bgcolor="ffbbbb"
| 116 || August 17 || Royals || 2–4 || Jackson (11–7) || Alexander (12–7) || Quisenberry (28) || 42,313 || 72–44 || Boxscore
|- align="center" bgcolor="bbffbb"
| 117 || August 18 || Royals || 10–6 || Filer (6–0) || Gubicza (9–7) || || 37,458 || 73–44 || Boxscore
|- align="center" bgcolor="ffbbbb"
| 118 || August 19 || @ Indians || 5 – 3 || Waddell (6-5) || Stieb (11-9) || || 6,280 || 73-45
|- align="center" bgcolor="bbffbb"
| 119 || August 20 || @ Indians || 3 – 2 || Key (10-5) || Smith (1-1) || Henke (4) || 7,005 || 74-45
|- align="center" bgcolor="ffbbbb"
| 120 || August 21 || @ Indians || 5 – 2 || Heaton (7-13) || Alexander (12-8) || || 6,342 || 74-46
|- align="center" bgcolor="bbffbb"
| 121 || August 23 || @ White Sox || 6 – 3 || Filer (7-0) || Burns (13-8) || Henke (5) || || 75-46
|- align="center" bgcolor="bbffbb"
| 122 || August 23 || @ White Sox || 10 – 3 || Acker (6-2) || Nelson (7-8) || || 22,021 || 76-46
|- align="center" bgcolor="bbffbb"
| 123 || August 24 || @ White Sox || 6 – 3 || Stieb (12-9) || Seaver (12-9) || Henke (6) || 26,113 || 77-46
|- align="center" bgcolor="ffbbbb"
| 124 || August 25 || @ White Sox || 5 – 3 || Bannister (6-11) || Key (10-6) || James (22) || 22,529 || 77-47
|- align="center" bgcolor="bbffbb"
| 125 || August 26 || @ Twins || 4 – 3 || Alexander (13-8) || Blyleven (12-13) || Henke (7) || 13,395 || 78-47
|- align="center" bgcolor="bbffbb"
| 126 || August 27 || @ Twins || 8 – 0 || Davis (1-0) || Viola (13-11) || || 12,780 || 79-47
|- align="center" bgcolor="ffbbbb"
| 127 || August 28 || @ Twins || 6 – 5 (10) || Filson (4-5) || Henke (3-1) || || 12,327 || 79-48
|- align="center" bgcolor="bbffbb"
| 128 || August 30 || White Sox || 5 – 3 || Key (11-6) || Bannister (6-12) || Henke (8) || 33,254 || 80-48
|- align="center" bgcolor="bbffbb"
| 129 || August 31 || White Sox || 6 – 2 || Lavelle (4-6) || Davis (1-2) || || 36,153 || 81-48
|-

|- align="center" bgcolor="ffbbbb"
| 130 || September 1 || White Sox || 4 – 1 || Burns (15-8) || Davis (1-1) || || 44,182 || 81-49
|- align="center" bgcolor="bbffbb"
| 131 || September 2 || Indians || 3 – 2 || Stieb (13-9) || Wardle (6-6) || Henke (9) || 31,239 || 82-49
|- align="center" bgcolor="ffbbbb"
| 132 || September 4 || Indians || 5 – 4 || Clark (2-3) || Henke (3-2) || Thompson (5) || 25,361 || 82-50
|- align="center" bgcolor="bbffbb"
| 133 || September 5 || Twins || 7 – 0 || Alexander (14-8) || Blyleven (13-14) || || 26,584 || 83-50
|- align="center" bgcolor="bbffbb"
| 134 || September 6 || Twins || 8 – 3 || Davis (2-1) || Viola (13-13) || || 26,440 || 84-50
|- align="center" bgcolor="ffbbbb"
| 135 || September 7 || Twins || 6 – 3 || Smithson (14-11) || Stieb (13-10) || || 30,368 || 84-51
|- align="center" bgcolor="bbffbb"
| 136 || September 8 || Twins || 10 – 9 || Lamp (8-0) || Portugal (1-2) || Lavelle (6) || 28,221 || 85-51
|- align="center" bgcolor="bbffbb"
| 137 || September 9 || Tigers || 5 – 3 || Key (12-6) || Mahler (0-1) || Henke (10) || 31,153 || 86-51
|- align="center" bgcolor="bbffbb"
| 138 || September 10 || Tigers || 2 – 1 || Alexander (15-8) || Morris (14-10) || || 31,228 || 87-51
|- align="center" bgcolor="bbffbb"
| 139 || September 11 || Tigers || 3 – 2 || Lamp (9-0) || Terrell (13-9) || Henke (11) || 31,269 || 88-51
|- align="center" bgcolor="ffbbbb"
| 140 || September 12 || @ Yankees || 7 – 5 || Guidry (19-5) || Lavelle (4-7) || Fisher (12) || 52,141 || 88-52
|- align="center" bgcolor="bbffbb"
| 141 || September 13 || @ Yankees || 3 – 2 || Lavelle (5-7) || Niekro (15-10) || Henke (12) || 53,303 || 89-52
|- align="center" bgcolor="bbffbb"
| 142 || September 14 || @ Yankees || 7 – 4 || Key (13-6) || Bordi (5-7) || || 54,367 || 90-52
|- align="center" bgcolor="bbffbb"
| 143 || September 15 || @ Yankees || 8 – 5 || Alexander (16-8) || Whitson (10-8) || || 54,699 || 91-52
|- align="center" bgcolor="ffbbbb"
| 144 || September 17 || @ Red Sox || 6 – 5 || Boyd (14-11) || Stieb (13-11) || Crawford (10) || 17,274 || 91-53
|- align="center" bgcolor="ffbbbb"
| 145 || September 18 || @ Red Sox || 13 – 1 || Nipper (9-11) || Clancy (7-5) || || 17,598 || 91-54
|- align="center" bgcolor="bbffbb"
| 146 || September 20 || Brewers || 7 – 5 || Key (14-6) || Cocanower (4-7) || Lavelle (7) || 31,442 || 92-54
|- align="center" bgcolor="bbffbb"
| 147 || September 21 || Brewers || 2 – 1 (14) || Lamp (10-0) || Darwin (7-18) || || 33,502 || 93-54
|- align="center" bgcolor="ffbbbb"
| 148 || September 22 || Brewers || 2 – 1 || Higuera (14-7) || Stieb (13-12) || || 38,155 || 93-55
|- align="center" bgcolor="bbffbb"
| 149 || September 23 || Brewers || 5 – 1 || Clancy (8-5) || Leary (1-2) || Henke (13) || 26,282 || 94-55
|- align="center" bgcolor="bbffbb"
| 150 || September 24 || Red Sox || 6 – 2 || Lamp (11-0) || Nipper (9-12) || || 29,815 || 95-55
|- align="center" bgcolor="ffbbbb"
| 151 || September 25 || Red Sox || 4 – 2 (13) || Crawford (6-4) || Cerutti (0-1) || Lollar (1) || 30,542 || 95-56
|- align="center" bgcolor="ffbbbb"
| 152 || September 26 || Red Sox || 4 – 1 || Sellers (2-0) || Alexander (16-9) || || 30,443 || 95-57
|- align="center" bgcolor="bbffbb"
| 153 || September 27 || @ Brewers || 5 – 1 || Stieb (14-12) || Higuera (14-8) || Lamp (2) || 17,050 || 96-57
|- align="center" bgcolor="bbffbb"
| 154 || September 28 || @ Brewers || 6 – 1 || Clancy (9-5) || Leary (1-3) || Lavelle (8) || 9,542 || 97-57
|- align="center" bgcolor="bbffbb"
| 155 || September 29 || @ Brewers || 13 – 5 || Acker (7-2) || Burris (9-13) || || 8,822 || 98-57
|-

|- align="center" bgcolor="ffbbbb"
| 156 || October 1 || @ Tigers || 6 – 1 || Tanana (11-14) || Alexander (16-10) || || 19,040 || 98-58
|- align="center" bgcolor="ffbbbb"
| 157 || October 2 || @ Tigers || 4 – 2 || Morris (16-11) || Stieb (14-13) || Cary (2) || 19,802 || 98-59
|- align="center" bgcolor="ffbbbb"
| 158 || October 3 || @ Tigers || 2 – 0 || Terrell (15-10) || Clancy (9-6) || || 23,381 || 98-60
|- align="center" bgcolor="ffbbbb"
| 159 || October 4 || Yankees || 4 – 3 || Scurry (1-0) || Henke (3-3) || Righetti (29) || 47,686 || 98-61
|- align="center" bgcolor="bbffbb"
| 160 || October 5 || Yankees || 5 – 1 || Alexander (17-10) || Cowley (12-6) || || 44,608 || 99-61
|- align="center" bgcolor="ffbbbb"
| 161 || October 6 || Yankees || 8 – 0 || Niekro (16-12) || Cerutti (0-2) || || 44,422 || 99-62
|-

| *An MLB Players strike forced the cancellation of all regular season games on August 6 and 7.  Most games were made up later in the season.

|- align="center" bgcolor="bbffbb"
| 1 || October 8 || Royals || 6–1 || Stieb (1–0) || Leibrandt (0–1) ||  || 39,115 || 1–0 || Boxscore
|- align="center" bgcolor="bbffbb"
| 2 || October 9 || Royals || 6–5 (10) || Henke (1–0) || Quisenberry (0–1) ||  || 34,029 || 2–0 || Boxscore
|- align="center" bgcolor="ffbbbb"
| 3 || October 11 || @ Royals || 5–6 || Farr (1–0) || Clancy (0–1) ||  || 40,224 || 2–1 || Boxscore
|- align="center" bgcolor="bbffbb"
| 4 || October 12 || @ Royals || 3–1 || Henke (2–0) || Leibrandt (0–2) ||  || 41,112 || 3–1 || Boxscore
|- align="center" bgcolor="ffbbbb"
| 5 || October 13 || @ Royals || 0–2 || Jackson (1–0) || Key (0–1) ||  || 40,046 || 3–2 || Boxscore
|- align="center" bgcolor="ffbbbb"
| 6 || October 15 || Royals || 3–5 || Gubicza (1–0) || Alexander (0–1) || Quisenberry (1) || 37,557 || 3–3 || Boxscore
|- align="center" bgcolor="ffbbbb"
| 7 || October 16 || Royals || 2–6 || Leibrandt (1–2) || Stieb (1–1) ||  || 32,084 || 3–4 || Boxscore
|-

Player stats

Batting

Starters by position
Note: Pos = Position; G = Games played; AB = At bats; H = Hits; Avg. = Batting average; HR = Home runs; RBI = Runs batted in

Other batters
Note: G = Games played; AB = At bats; H = Hits; Avg. = Batting average; HR = Home runs; RBI = Runs batted in

Pitching

Starting pitchers
Note: G = Games pitched; IP = Innings pitched; W = Wins; L = Losses; ERA = Earned run average; SO = Strikeouts

Other pitchers
Note: G = Games pitched; IP = Innings pitched; W = Wins; L = Losses; ERA = Earned run average; SO = Strikeouts

Relief pitchers
Note: G = Games pitched; IP = Innings pitched; W = Wins; L = Losses; SV = Saves; ERA = Earned run average; SO = Strikeouts

ALCS

Game 1
October 8, Exhibition Stadium

Game 2
October 9, Exhibition Stadium

Game 3
October 11, Royals Stadium

Game 4
October 12, Royals Stadium

Game 5
October 13, Royals Stadium

Game 6
October 15, Exhibition Stadium

Game 7
October 16, Exhibition Stadium

Awards and honors
Jesse Barfield, American League Leader in Outfield Assists (22)
George Bell, Silver Slugger Award
Bobby Cox, American League Manager of the Year Award
 Bobby Cox, The Sporting News Manager of the Year Award
Dave Stieb, Pitcher of the Month Award, May
 Dave Stieb, American League ERA Champion, 2.48

All-Star Game
Dámaso García, second base
Jimmy Key, pitcher
 Dave Stieb, pitcher
 Ernie Whitt, catcher

Farm system

LEAGUE CHAMPIONS: Florence

References

External links
1985 Toronto Blue Jays at Baseball Reference
1985 Toronto Blue Jays at Baseball Almanac

Toronto Blue Jays seasons
Toronto Blue Jays season
American League East champion seasons
1985 in Canadian sports
1985 in Toronto